The following is a list of awards and nominations received by American film director, screenwriter and producer David O. Russell. Russell has been nominated for five Academy Awards and four Golden Globes. He has won four Independent Spirit Awards and two BAFTA Awards. He has been nominated for three WGA awards and two DGA awards. Regarding five Academy Award nominations, three for Best Director for The Fighter, Silver Linings Playbook and American Hustle  and two for Best Adapted Screenplay for Silver Linings Playbook and American Hustle.

Major associations

Academy Awards

BAFTA Awards

Directors Guild of America Award

Golden Globe Awards

Independent Spirit Awards

Writers Guild of America Award

Film critic awards

Miscellaneous awards 
Satellite Award

References

External links 
 

Lists of awards received by film director
Lists of awards received by writer